Merle "Mel" Wasserman (1930 – April 29, 2002) Was a businessman, entrepreneur, and founder of CEDU Education. He was a pioneer in the unaccredited Therapeutic Boarding School industry. Over the course of many years, he opened a total of six therapeutic boarding schools in the states of California and Idaho.

Biography

Paris Hilton kicks off the section of her memoir  about entering the troubled teen industry at CEDU School with a tale about Mel Wasserman, “Once upon a time in Palm Springs, a furniture salesman named Mel Wasserman was on his way to a local diner and saw some teenagers on a street corner, protesting whatever people were protesting in 1964. According to legend, Mel invited them to his house for spaghetti dinner and offered them a place to stay for the night. They could even stay longer, he said, but they had to live by his agreement, which included a strict code of appearances and behavior and participation in group ‘therapy sessions.’ Wasserman was a disciple of Charles E. Dederich, founder of Synanon, a violent cult that had been driven underground but never fully eradicated by the FBI." 

After starting work with troubled teens in his home in Palm Springs, California, Wasserman decided to sell his furniture business and invest in a school to help teenagers and cash in on the troubled teen industry. Success of the CEDU program was dramatic and it rapidly expanded into other specialized educational programs possibly due to the massive profit potential Wasserman realized by charging in excess of $6,000 per month per student while hiring non-credentialed adults as staff. Although Wasserman had no training or credentials in the relevant fields, he allegedly surrounded himself with noted educators and professionals and created a system of education that included a strict adherence to his own discredited and cult-like set of principles. He has been quoted as saying to students and parents, "Take away boundaries and bring in a sewer, a biker society. The magic is not in the building itself, it is in the setting of boundaries, a certain posture and a certain way we act inside them, and then we have something which facilitates what we are trying to do here."

Articles and Podcasts about CEDU 

June 25, 2018 - Running My Anger: The Legacy of the CEDU Cult, an account of what it was like to live through CEDU in Idaho and California is published on Medium. David Safran discusses the current documentaries on CEDU, Rocky Mountain Academy, and articles on trauma and how they relate to them as a survivor of CEDU. Safran goes onto publish several more CEDU articles on Medium including Update 1 — Calling Brigitte Wasserman, Update 2 — Northwest Academy's Second Closure, Update 3 — Keeping That CEDU Dream in 2018, and "In general, we were treated the same:" An Interview with CEDU Counselor, Randolph Reynolds.

July 6, 2020 - The Cult Vault, a podcast hosted by Kacey Baker sheds light on Synanon and CEDU 

October 11, 2020 - CEDU Records From California's Department of Social Services are published on Medium by David Safran.

October 31, 2022 - Los Angeles Magazine published the article “Why Are Police Stifling the Investigation Into 3 Teens Who Vanished From a Controversial Residential Treatment Facility?” The article addresses the disappearance of John Inman, Blake Pursley, and Daniel Yuen who vanished from CEDU School’s campus in Running Springs, California in 1993, 1994, and 2004.

March 1, 2023 - Los Angeles Magazine published the article “Suspect No. 1: Inside Daniel Yuen’s Missing Person Case,” which does a deep dive into his disappearance from CEDU School’s campus in Running Springs, California on February 8, 2004.

Memoirs about CEDU 

May 19, 2005 - Oh, the Glory of it All, a memoir about the time Sean Wilsey spent at Cascade School and Amity School which addresses their ties to CEDU is published.

July 1, 2007 - Gone to the Crazies, a memoir about the time Alison Weaver spent at Cascade School, which addresses its ties to CEDU is published.

September 18, 2012 - The Discarded Ones, a novel written by James Tipper that is based on CEDU School is published. 

July 23, 2015 - Dead, Insane, or in Jail: a CEDU Memoir written by Zack Bonnie is published.

February 26, 2018 - Dead, Insane, or in Jail: Overwritten, the second book in Zack Bonnie's series is published.

May 13, 2018 - Whiteout, a memoir about the time Lathrop Lybrook spent trapped in the troubled teen industry including being sent to Rocky Mountain Academy, Ascent Wilderness Program, and North Idaho Behavioral Health from September 1998 to December 1999 is posted online.

July 20, 2021 - Stolen, a memoir by Elizabeth Gilpin about the time she spent in the wilderness of the Appalachian Mountains and then at Carlbrook School was published.

January 18, 2022 - This Will Be Funny Later, a memoir by Roseanne Barr's daughter Jenny Pentland, is published. In it, she describes the time she spent at Rocky Mountain Academy, Boulder Creek Academy, and Ascent Wilderness Program, along with several other troubled teen industry programs.

August 30, 2022 - because God loves the wasp, a memoir in verse about the time Elisabeth Blair spent at Ascent Wilderness Program and Rocky Mountain Academy from March 1997 to August 1999 is published. 

March 14, 2023 - Paris: The Memoir, an autobiography by Paris Hilton that exposes the time she spent trapped in the troubled teen industry including being sent to CEDU School, Ascent Wilderness Program, Cascade School, and Provo Canyon School from the summer of 1997 to January 1999 is published.

References 

People from Sandpoint, Idaho
Businesspeople from Los Angeles
Businesspeople from Palm Springs, California
1930 births
2002 deaths
20th-century American businesspeople